Neckeraceae is a moss family in the order Hypnales. There are about 200 species native to temperate and tropical regions. Most grow on rocks, or other plants.

Description
Members of the family are usually large and glossy plants with creeping stolons that bear small leaves and tufts of rhizoids. Stems are generally frondose, but may rarely be dendroid. Leaf cell shape is almost always smooth, short, and firm-walled. Marginal cells are typically quadrate to short-rectangular in few to several rows. The sporophyte features are variable between genera.

Species are epiphytic, epilithic, or aquatic.

Classification
The Neckeraceae were originally placed within the Leucodontales. However, they are now included in the Hypnales. The following genera are recognised in the family Neckeraceae:

References

 
Moss families